Joanna Portman (1979–2010) was a fictional Field Operative in the Counter-Terrorism department at MI5, featured in the British television series, Spooks, also known as MI5 in the United States. She was played by Miranda Raison. A former aspiring journalist, she joined the team in the fifth episode of series 4 after being recruited by Adam Carter; Jo retained her journalist occupation as her MI5 cover. She was killed in a volatile hostage situation in the third episode of the eighth series.

Character history

Introduction
Jo is first introduced in the fifth episode of series four. At that time, Jo is an aspiring journalist with an inquisitive instinct and becomes embroiled in an undercover operation involving Section D. She immediately recognizes that Adam Carter, at the time posing as a gas engineer, isn't all he makes out to be and her latent skills are soon put to good use, ensuring the success of Adam and his colleagues. Having earned the respect of Adam and the rest of Section D, she is offered a job as a junior case officer on the grid and gladly accepts the role.

Series 4-5
Jo's initial strong start was marred by the death of Fiona, Adam's wife; Jo believed she was partly responsible.

Throughout series 4 and 5, Jo develops a close relationship with fellow MI5 operative, Zafar Younis, although this never developed beyond subtle flirting. Zaf did offer her a room at his home after she explained she was having trouble keeping her true occupation secret from her flatmate whilst drunk, but it is unknown if she accepted the offer. It is also hinted that she cares very deeply for her mother, who is ill.

As a junior case officer, Jo divided much of her time between grid based activities and field missions. Throughout her tenure on the show, she took part in many important missions including serving as the bodyguard (albeit secretly at first) to the Prime Minister's university aged son in series five, when she successfully helped him elude capture by a reactionary group of anti-government activists.

Series 6-7
Continuing her activities within Section D, Jo is instrumental in the hiring of Ben Kaplan as a junior case officer. The pair quickly form a strong professional bond, and participate in many missions together. 
Toward the end of series 6, Adam and Jo attempt to infiltrate a dangerous gang, the Redbacks. However their infiltration ultimately proves unsuccessful, and the pair are captured and imprisoned. Having already been raped and tortured by Bochard and afraid that she will not be able to withstand further torture, Jo begs for Adam to kill her so that she will not divulge classified information. The episode concludes with Special Forces storming the building, only to find Adam sitting silently as he cradles an apparently lifeless Jo in his lap.

In the first episode of Series 7 it is revealed that Adam did not kill Jo, rather she was playing dead. However, the young officer is severely traumatized by her ordeal and has since taken an extended leave of absence from the service. She eventually rejoins Section D at the conclusion of the episode, following the death of Adam, who Harry Pearce described at the beginning of the episode as "the only person she trusts." 
After rejoining her colleagues, Jo is still suffering from post traumatic stress and struggles to readjust to her duties. She is particularly devastated by the death of Adam in the previous episode, and is not long after almost killed herself in a similar explosion, but just manages to survive that particular blast.

Throughout the seventh series, Jo is haunted by visions of one of her captors, and risks the success of several missions because of these distractions.
Ros Myers eventually approaches Jo to discuss her compromised state, and during their exchange it is revealed Jo was not only tortured during her imprisonment by the Bochard, but repeatedly raped; it was also revealed that she was the one who killed Bochard but could not remember the event due to the trauma. Ros offers her some words of encouragement, and reminds her of the unique strains of being a female member of the service, leaving Jo with new perspective.
Eventually, Jo regains her composure and becomes an indispensable member of the team once again, but is soon shocked by the murder of her colleague and former journalist/lover Ben Kaplan at the hands of double agent Connie James. After expressing her bafflement at Connie's actions, she volunteers to be the one to break the news of Ben's death to his bereaved family.

Series 8 and death
In series 8, Jo is instrumental in the reinstatement of the newly returned Ruth Evershed. Jo convinces a torn Ruth that she is missed on the team and that she should talk to Harry. Her attempts are successful, and Ruth returns, but Harry later jokingly threatens to deport Jo if she becomes entwined in his private life again.

Later in the series, a group of terrorists storm a meeting of industrial billionaires and begin a series of ‘trials’, broadcast via an internet stream that bring to light the white collar crimes of those in question. After the first of the hostages is executed, both the US and UK governments agree to an aerial bombardment as a counter-strike. With Ros also taken hostage and out of radio contact, Harry instructs Jo to approach the hostage takers and negotiate. Her attempts prove initially successful, but the group's leader attempts to detonate an explosive. A struggle ensues, and Jo is caught in an awkward hold with the terrorist. It quickly dawns on Jo that the only way to bring the situation to a close is an act of self-sacrifice, and she silently nods for a now armed Ros to take the shot; killing the terrorist, but sacrificing herself in the process.

Ros is shaken after her part in the self-sacrifice of Jo, and her death continues to plague her throughout the remainder of series 8. Soon after, Harry is forced to break the news of Jo's demise to a tearful Ruth and in the following episode, Sarah Caulfield and her CIA associates deliver flowers and condolences to Section D.

Jo's place on the team remains vacant throughout the remainder of series 8 and she is only replaced in the following series when Beth Bailey is installed as junior case officer.

Other appearances
Jo's name appears in a newspaper byline in series 3, episode 6 of the crime  drama Hustle, a show devised by the same creators as Spooks.

References

Television characters introduced in 2005
Spooks (TV series) characters
Fictional secret agents and spies
Fictional English people